Super fine TFT (SFT) is a NEC display technology that is claimed to provide better viewing angles and pixel response speed than other technologies.

References 

Display technology
LCD brand names